Jean-Pierre Le Lain (born 23 September 1961) is a French rower. He competed in the men's coxless four event at the 1992 Summer Olympics.

References

External links
 

1961 births
Living people
French male rowers
Olympic rowers of France
Rowers at the 1992 Summer Olympics
Place of birth missing (living people)